Gombak District is an administrative district in the state of Selangor, Malaysia.

Gombak may also refer to:

Gombak (town), in Gombak District
Gombak (federal constituency), represented in the Dewan Rakyat
Gombak (state constituency), in the Selangor State Legislative Assembly 1974–1978, 1978–1982, and 1982–1986
Gombak Setia (state constituency), represented in the Selangor State Legislative Assembly since 1986